The following is a list of the weevils recorded in Great Britain. For other beetles, see List of beetle species recorded in Britain.

Orthoceri Schönherr, 1823

Family Nemonychidae Bedel, 1882
Cimberis attelaboides (Fabricius, 1787)
Family Anthribidae Billberg, 1820
Anthribus fasciatus (Forster, 1771)
Anthribus nebulosus (Forster, 1771)
Platyrhinus resinosus (Scopoli, 1763)
Platystomos albinus (Linnaeus, 1758)
Enedreytes sepicola (Fabricius, 1793)
Dissoleucas niveirostris (Fabricius, 1798)
Choragus sheppardi Kirby, 1819
Araecerus fasciculatus (De Geer, 1775)
Bruchela rufipes (Olivier, 1790)
Family Rhynchitidae Gistel, 1848
Involvulus caeruleus (De Geer, 1775)
Involvulus cupreus (Linnaeus, 1758)
Lasiorhynchites cavifrons (Gyllenhal, 1833)
Lasiorhynchites olivaceus (Gyllenhal, 1833)
Neocoenorrhinus aeneovirens (Marsham, 1802)
Neocoenorrhinus aequatus (Linnaeus, 1767)
Neocoenorrhinus germanicus (Herbst, 1797)
Neocoenorrhinus interpunctatus (Stephens, 1831)
Neocoenorrhinus pauxillus (Germar, 1824)
Rhynchites auratus (Scopoli, 1763)
Rhynchites bacchus (Linnaeus, 1758)
Temnocerus longiceps (C. G. Thomson, 1888)
Temnocerus nanus (Paykull, 1792)
Temnocerus tomentosus (Gyllenhal, 1839)
Byctiscus betulae (Linnaeus, 1758)
Byctiscus populi (Linnaeus, 1758)
Deporaus betulae (Linnaeus, 1758)
Deporaus mannerheimii (Hummel, 1823)
Family Attelabidae Billberg, 1820
Attelabus nitens (Scopoli, 1763)
Apoderus coryli (Linnaeus, 1758)
Family Apionidae Schönherr, 1823
Apion cruentatum Walton, 1844
Apion frumentarium (Linnaeus, 1758)
Apion haematodes Kirby, 1808
Apion rubens Stephens, 1839
Apion rubiginosum Grill, 1893
Aizobius sedi (Germar, 1818)
Helianthemapion aciculare (Germar, 1817)
Perapion affine (Kirby, 1808)
Perapion curtirostre (Germar, 1817)
Perapion hydrolapathi (Marsham, 1802)
Perapion marchicum (Herbst, 1797)
Perapion violaceum (Kirby, 1808)
Perapion lemoroi (Brisout, Ch., 1880)
Pseudaplemonus limonii (Kirby, 1808)
Aspidapion radiolus (Marsham, 1802)
Aspidapion soror (Rey, 1895)
Aspidapion aeneum (Fabricius, 1775)
Acentrotypus brunnipes (Boheman, 1839)
Ceratapion armatum (Gerstäcker, 1854)
Ceratapion carduorum (Kirby, 1808)
Ceratapion gibbirostre (Gyllenhal, 1813)
Ceratapion onopordi (Kirby, 1808)
Diplapion confluens (Kirby, 1808)
Diplapion stolidum (Germar, 1817)
Omphalapion beuthini (Hoffmann, Anton, 1874)
Omphalapion hookerorum (Kirby, 1808)
Omphalapion laevigatum (Paykull, 1792)
Exapion difficile (Herbst, 1797)
Exapion fuscirostre (Fabricius, 1775)
Exapion genistae (Kirby, 1811)
Exapion ulicis (Forster, 1771)
Ixapion variegatum (Wencker, 1864)
Kalcapion pallipes (Kirby, 1808)
Kalcapion semivittatum (Gyllenhal, 1833)
Melanapion minimum (Herbst, 1797)
Squamapion atomarium (Kirby, 1808)
Squamapion cineraceum (Wencker, 1864)
Squamapion flavimanum (Gyllenhal, 1833)
Squamapion vicinum (Kirby, 1808)
Taeniapion urticarium (Herbst, 1784)
Malvapion malvae (Fabricius, 1775)
Pseudapion rufirostre (Fabricius, 1775)
Rhopalapion longirostre (Olivier, 1807)
Cyanapion spencii (Kirby, 1808)
Cyanapion afer (Gyllenhal, 1833)
Cyanapion gyllenhalii (Kirby, 1808)
Eutrichapion ervi (Kirby, 1808)
Eutrichapion viciae (Paykull, 1800)
Eutrichapion vorax (Herbst, 1797)
Eutrichapion punctigerum (Paykull, 1792)
Hemitrichapion reflexum (Gyllenhal, 1833)
Hemitrichapion waltoni (Stephens, 1839)
Holotrichapion ononis (Kirby, 1808)
Holotrichapion pisi (Fabricius, 1801)
Holotrichapion aethiops (Herbst, 1797)
Oxystoma cerdo (Gerstäcker, 1854)
Oxystoma craccae (Linnaeus, 1767)
Oxystoma pomonae (Fabricius, 1798)
Oxystoma subulatum (Kirby, 1808)
Pirapion immune (Kirby, 1808)
Catapion curtisi (Stephens, 1831)
Catapion pubescens (Kirby, 1811)
Catapion seniculus (Kirby, 1808)
Ischnopterapion loti (Kirby, 1808)
Ischnopterapion modestum (Germar, 1817)
Ischnopterapion virens (Herbst, 1797)
Protopirapion atratulum (Germar, 1817)
Stenopterapion intermedium (Eppelsheim, 1875)
Stenopterapion meliloti (Kirby, 1808)
Stenopterapion tenue (Kirby, 1808)
Stenopterapion scutellare (Kirby, 1811)
Synapion ebeninum (Kirby, 1808)
Betulapion simile (Kirby, 1811)
Protapion apricans (Herbst, 1797)
Protapion assimile (Kirby, 1808)
Protapion difforme (Germar, 1818)
Protapion dissimile (Germar, 1817)
Protapion filirostre (Kirby, 1808)
Protapion fulvipes (Geoffroy in Fourcroy, 1785)
Protapion laevicolle (Kirby, 1811)
Protapion nigritarse (Kirby, 1808)
Protapion ononidis (Gyllenhal, 1827)
Protapion ryei (Blackburn, 1874)
Protapion schoenherri (Boheman, 1839)
Protapion trifolii (Linnaeus, 1768)
Protapion varipes (Germar, 1817)
Pseudoprotapion astragali (Paykull, 1800)
Family Nanophyidae Gistel, 1856
Dieckmanniellus gracilis (Redtenbacher, 1849)
Nanophyes marmoratus (Goeze, 1777)
Family Dryophthoridae Schönherr, 1825
Dryophthorus corticalis (Paykull, 1792)
Sitophilus granarius (Linnaeus, 1758)
Sitophilus oryzae (Linnaeus, 1763)
Sitophilus zeamais Motschulsky, 1855
Family Erirhinidae Schönherr, 1825
Grypus equiseti (Fabricius, 1775)
Notaris acridulus (Linnaeus, 1758)
Notaris aethiops (Fabricius, 1793)
Notaris scirpi (Fabricius, 1793)
Procas granulicollis Walton, 1848
Procas picipes (Marsham, 1802)
Thryogenes festucae (Herbst, 1795)
Thryogenes fiorii Zumpt, 1928
Thryogenes nereis (Paykull, 1800)
Thryogenes scirrhosus (Gyllenhal, 1836)
Tournotaris bimaculatus (Fabricius, 1787)
Stenopelmus rufinasus Gyllenhal, 1836
Family Raymondionymidae Reitter, 1912
Ferreria marqueti (Aubé, 1863)

Gonatoceri Schönherr, 1825

Family Curculionidae Latreille, 1802
Archarius pyrrhoceras (Marsham, 1802)
Archarius salicivorus (Paykull, 1792)
Curculio betulae (Stephens, 1831)
Curculio glandium Marsham, 1802
Curculio nucum Linnaeus, 1758
Curculio rubidus (Gyllenhal, 1836)
Curculio venosus (Gravenhorst, 1807)
Curculio villosus (Fabricius, 1781)
Acalyptus carpini (Fabricius, 1793)
Anthonomus bituberculatus C. G. Thomson, 1868
Anthonomus brunnipennis (Curtis, 1840)
Anthonomus chevrolati Desbrochers, 1868
Anthonomus conspersus Desbrochers, 1868
Anthonomus humeralis (Panzer, 1795)
Anthonomus pedicularius (Linnaeus, 1758)
Anthonomus piri Kollar, 1837
Anthonomus pomorum (Linnaeus, 1758)
Anthonomus rubi (Herbst, 1795)
Anthonomus rufus Gyllenhal, 1836
Anthonomus ulmi (De Geer, 1775)
Anthonomus varians (Paykull, 1792)
Anthonomus rectirostris (Linnaeus, 1758)
Brachonyx pineti (Paykull, 1792)
Cionus alauda (Herbst, 1784)
Cionus hortulanus (Fourcroy, 1785)
Cionus longicollis Brisout, Ch., 1863
Cionus nigritarsis Reitter, 1904
Cionus scrophulariae (Linnaeus, 1758)
Cionus tuberculosus (Scopoli, 1763)
Cleopus pulchellus (Herbst, 1795)
Ellescus bipunctatus (Linnaeus, 1758)
Dorytomus affinis (Paykull, 1800)
Dorytomus dejeani Faust, 1882
Dorytomus filirostris (Gyllenhal, 1836)
Dorytomus hirtipennis Bedel, 1884
Dorytomus ictor (Herbst, 1795)
Dorytomus longimanus (Forster, 1771)
Dorytomus majalis (Paykull, 1792)
Dorytomus melanophthalmus (Paykull, 1792)
Dorytomus rufatus (Bedel, 1888)
Dorytomus salicinus (Gyllenhal, 1827)
Dorytomus salicis Walton, 1851
Dorytomus taeniatus (Fabricius, 1781)
Dorytomus tortrix (Linnaeus, 1761)
Dorytomus tremulae (Fabricius, 1787)
Cleopomiarus graminis (Gyllenhal, 1813)
Cleopomiarus micros (Germar, 1821)
Cleopomiarus plantarum (Germar, 1824)
Gymnetron beccabungae (Linnaeus, 1761)
Gymnetron melanarium (Germar, 1821)
Gymnetron rostellum (Herbst, 1795)
Gymnetron veronicae (Germar, 1821)
Gymnetron villosulum Gyllenhal, 1838
Mecinus circulatus (Marsham, 1802)
Mecinus collaris Germar, 1821
Mecinus janthinus Germar, 1821
Mecinus labilis (Herbst, 1795)
Mecinus pascuorum (Gyllenhal, 1813)
Mecinus pyraster (Herbst, 1795)
Miarus campanulae (Linnaeus, 1767)
Rhinusa antirrhini (Paykull, 1800)
Rhinusa collina (Gyllenhal, 1813)
Rhinusa linariae (Panzer, 1795)
Isochnus foliorum (O. F. Müller, 1764)
Isochnus sequensi (Stierlin, 1894)
Orchestes alni (Linnaeus, 1758)
Orchestes calceatus (Germar, 1821)
Orchestes iota (Fabricius, 1787)
Orchestes pilosus (Fabricius, 1781)
Orchestes quercus (Linnaeus, 1758)
Orchestes rusci (Herbst, 1795)
Orchestes signifer (Creutzer, 1799)
Orchestes testaceus (O. F. Müller, 1776)
Orchestes fagi (Linnaeus, 1758)
Pseudorchestes pratensis (Germar, 1821)
Rhamphus oxyacanthae (Marsham, 1802)
Rhamphus pulicarius (Herbst, 1795)
Rhamphus subaeneus Illiger, 1807
Rhynchaenus lonicerae (Herbst, 1795)
Tachyerges decoratus (Germar, 1821)
Tachyerges pseudostigma (Tempère, 1982)
Tachyerges salicis (Linnaeus, 1758)
Tachyerges stigma (Germar, 1821)
Smicronyx coecus (Reich, 1797)
Smicronyx jungermanniae (Reich, 1797)
Smicronyx reichi (Gyllenhal, 1836)
Pachytychius haematocephalus (Gyllenhal, 1836)
Orthochaetes insignis (Aubé, 1863)
Orthochaetes setiger (Beck, 1817)
Pseudostyphlus pillumus (Gyllenhal, 1836)
Sibinia arenariae Stephens, 1831
Sibinia primita (Herbst, 1795)
Sibinia pyrrhodactyla (Marsham, 1802)
Sibinia sodalis Germar, 1824
Tychius breviusculus Desbrochers, 1873
Tychius crassirostris Kirsch, 1871
Tychius junceus (Reich, 1797)
Tychius lineatulus Stephens, 1831
Tychius meliloti Stephens, 1831
Tychius parallelus (Panzer, 1794)
Tychius picirostris (Fabricius, 1787)
Tychius polylineatus (Germar, 1824)
Tychius pusillus Germar, 1842
Tychius quinquepunctatus (Linnaeus, 1758)
Tychius schneideri (Herbst, 1795)
Tychius squamulatus Gyllenhal, 1836
Tychius stephensi Gyllenhal, 1836
Tychius tibialis Boheman, 1843
Bagous argillaceus Gyllenhal, 1836
Bagous binodulus (Herbst, 1795)
Bagous brevis Gyllenhal, 1836
Bagous collignensis (Herbst, 1797)
Bagous czwalinae Seidlitz, 1891
Bagous diglyptus Boheman, 1845
Bagous frit (Herbst, 1795)
Bagous limosus (Gyllenhal, 1827)
Bagous longitarsis C. G. Thomson, 1868
Bagous lutulosus (Gyllenhal, 1827)
Bagous nodulosus Gyllenhal, 1836
Bagous subcarinatus Gyllenhal, 1836
Bagous tempestivus (Herbst, 1795)
Bagous glabrirostris (Herbst, 1795)
Bagous lutosus (Gyllenhal, 1813)
Bagous lutulentus (Gyllenhal, 1813)
Bagous puncticollis Boheman, 1854
Bagous robustus H. Brisout, 1863
Bagous tubulus Caldara & O'Brien, 1994
Bagous petro (Herbst, 1795)
Bagous alismatis (Marsham, 1802)
Aulacobaris lepidii (Germar, 1824)
Aulacobaris picicornis (Marsham, 1802)
Baris analis (Olivier, 1790)
Cosmobaris scolopacea (Germar, 1818)
Melanobaris laticollis (Marsham, 1802)
Limnobaris dolorosa (Goeze, 1777)
Limnobaris t-album (Linnaeus, 1758)
Amalorrhynchus melanarius (Stephens, 1831)
Calosirus terminatus (Herbst, 1795)
Ceutorhynchus alliariae H. Brisout, 1860
Ceutorhynchus assimilis (Paykull, 1792)
Ceutorhynchus atomus Boheman, 1845
Ceutorhynchus cakilis (Hansen, 1917)
Ceutorhynchus chalybaeus Germar, 1824
Ceutorhynchus cochleariae (Gyllenhal, 1813)
Ceutorhynchus constrictus (Marsham, 1802)
Ceutorhynchus contractus (Marsham, 1802)
Ceutorhynchus erysimi (Fabricius, 1787)
Ceutorhynchus hepaticus Gyllenhal, 1837
Ceutorhynchus hirtulus Germar, 1824
Ceutorhynchus insularis Dieckmann, 1971
Ceutorhynchus obstrictus (Marsham, 1802)
Ceutorhynchus pallidactylus (Marsham, 1802)
Ceutorhynchus parvulus Brisout, Ch., 1869
Ceutorhynchus pectoralis Weise, 1895
Ceutorhynchus pervicax Weise, 1883
Ceutorhynchus picitarsis Gyllenhal, 1837
Ceutorhynchus pulvinatus Gyllenhal, 1837
Ceutorhynchus pumilio (Gyllenhal, 1827)
Ceutorhynchus pyrrhorhynchus (Marsham, 1802)
Ceutorhynchus querceti (Gyllenhal, 1813)
Ceutorhynchus rapae Gyllenhal, 1837
Ceutorhynchus resedae (Marsham, 1802)
Ceutorhynchus sulcicollis (Paykull, 1800)
Ceutorhynchus syrites Germar, 1824
Ceutorhynchus thomsoni Kolbe, 1900
Ceutorhynchus turbatus Schultze, 1903
Ceutorhynchus typhae (Herbst, 1795)
Ceutorhynchus unguicularis C. G. Thomson, 1871
Coeliodes rana (Fabricius, 1787)
Coeliodes ruber (Marsham, 1802)
Coeliodes transversealbofasciatus (Goeze, 1777)
Coeliodinus nigritarsis (Hartmann, 1895)
Coeliodinus rubicundus (Herbst, 1795)
Datonychus angulosus (Boheman, 1845)
Datonychus arquatus (Herbst, 1795)
Datonychus melanostictus (Marsham, 1802)
Datonychus urticae (Boheman, 1845)
Drupenatus nasturtii (Germar, 1824)
Ethelcus verrucatus (Gyllenhal, 1837)
Glocianus distinctus (Brisout, Ch., 1870)
Glocianus moelleri (C. G. Thomson, 1868)
Glocianus pilosellus (Gyllenhal, 1837)
Glocianus punctiger (Gyllenhal, 1837)
Hadroplontus litura (Fabricius, 1775)
Hadroplontus trimaculatus (Fabricius, 1775)
Micrelus ericae (Gyllenhal, 1813)
Microplontus campestris (Gyllenhal, 1837)
Microplontus rugulosus (Herbst, 1795)
Microplontus triangulum (Boheman, 1845)
Mogulones asperifoliarum (Gyllenhal, 1813)
Mogulones euphorbiae (Brisout, Ch., 1866)
Mogulones geographicus (Goeze, 1777)
Nedyus quadrimaculatus (Linnaeus, 1758)
Parethelcus pollinarius (Forster, 1771)
Poophagus sisymbrii (Fabricius, 1777)
Sirocalodes depressicollis (Gyllenhal, 1813)
Sirocalodes mixtus (Mulsant & Rey, 1858)
Sirocalodes quercicola (Paykull, 1792)
Stenocarus ruficornis (Stephens, 1831)
Tapeinotus sellatus (Fabricius, 1794)
Thamiocolus viduatus (Gyllenhal, 1813)
Trichosirocalus barnevillei (Grenier, 1866)
Trichosirocalus dawsoni (Brisout, Ch., 1869)
Trichosirocalus horridus (Panzer, 1801)
Trichosirocalus rufulus (Dufour, 1851)
Trichosirocalus thalhammeri (Schultze, 1906)
Trichosirocalus troglodytes (Fabricius, 1787)
Zacladus exiguus (Olivier, 1807)
Zacladus geranii (Paykull, 1800)
Amalus scortillum (Herbst, 1795)
Mononychus punctumalbum (Herbst, 1784)
Eubrychius velutus (Beck, 1817)
Neophytobius muricatus (Brisout, Ch., 1867)
Neophytobius quadrinodosus (Gyllenhal, 1813)
Pelenomus canaliculatus (Fåhraeus, 1843)
Pelenomus comari (Herbst, 1795)
Pelenomus olssoni (Israelson, 1972)
Pelenomus quadricorniger (Colonnelli, 1986)
Pelenomus quadrituberculatus (Fabricius, 1787)
Pelenomus waltoni (Boheman, 1843)
Pelenomus zumpti (Wagner, 1939)
Phytobius leucogaster (Marsham, 1802)
Rhinoncus albicinctus Gyllenhal, 1837
Rhinoncus bruchoides (Herbst, 1784)
Rhinoncus castor (Fabricius, 1793)
Rhinoncus inconspectus (Herbst, 1795)
Rhinoncus pericarpius (Linnaeus, 1758)
Rhinoncus perpendicularis (Reich, 1797)
Rutidosoma globulus (Herbst, 1795)
Cossonus linearis (Fabricius, 1775)
Cossonus parallelepipedus (Herbst, 1795)
Rhopalomesites tardyi (Curtis, 1825)
Pselactus spadix (Herbst, 1795)
Pseudophloeophagus aeneopiceus (Boheman, 1845)
Stereocorynes truncorum (Germar, 1824)
Euophryum confine (Broun, 1881)
Euophryum rufum (Broun, 1880)
Pentarthrum huttoni Wollaston, 1854
Macrorhyncolus littoralis (Broun, 1880)
Rhyncolus ater (Linnaeus, 1758)
Phloeophagus lignarius (Marsham, 1802)
Cryptorhynchus lapathi (Linnaeus, 1758)
Acalles misellus Boheman, 1844 ?
Acalles ptinoides (Marsham, 1802)
Kyklioacalles roboris (Curtis, 1835)
Gronops inaequalis Boheman, 1842
Gronops lunatus (Fabricius, 1775)
Graptus triguttatus (Fabricius, 1775)
Brachyderes incanus (Linnaeus, 1758)
Brachyderes lusitanicus (Fabricius, 1781)
Neliocarus faber (Herbst, 1784)
Neliocarus nebulosus (Stephens, 1831)
Neliocarus sus (Stephens, 1831)
Strophosoma capitatum (De Geer, 1775)
Strophosoma fulvicorne (Walton, 1846)
Strophosoma melanogrammum (Forster, 1771)
Attactagenus plumbeus (Marsham, 1802)
Philopedon plagiatum (Schaller, 1783)
Barynotus moerens (Fabricius, 1793)
Barynotus obscurus (Fabricius, 1775)
Barynotus squamosus Germar, 1824
Omiamima mollina (Boheman, 1834)
Otiorhynchus arcticus (O. Fabricius, 1780)
Otiorhynchus armadillo (Rossi, 1792)
Otiorhynchus atroapterus (De Geer, 1775)
Otiorhynchus aurifer Boheman, 1843
Otiorhynchus auropunctatus Gyllenhal, 1834
Otiorhynchus clavipes (Bonsdorff, 1785)
Otiorhynchus crataegi Germar, 1824
Otiorhynchus desertus Rosenhauer, 1847
Otiorhynchus ligneus (Olivier, 1807)
Otiorhynchus ligustici (Linnaeus, 1758)
Otiorhynchus morio (Fabricius, 1781)
Otiorhynchus nodosus (O. F. Müller, 1764)
Otiorhynchus ovatus (Linnaeus, 1758)
Otiorhynchus porcatus (Herbst, 1795)
Otiorhynchus raucus (Fabricius, 1777)
Otiorhynchus rugifrons (Gyllenhal, 1813)
Otiorhynchus rugosostriatus (Goeze, 1777)
Otiorhynchus salicicola Heyden, 1908
Otiorhynchus scaber (Linnaeus, 1758)
Otiorhynchus setosulus Stierlin, 1861
Otiorhynchus singularis (Linnaeus, 1767)
Otiorhynchus sulcatus (Fabricius, 1775)
Otiorhynchus uncinatus Germar, 1824
Caenopsis fissirostris (Walton, 1847)
Caenopsis waltoni (Boheman, 1843)
Peritelus sphaeroides Germar, 1824
Phyllobius pyri (Linnaeus, 1758)
Phyllobius vespertinus (Fabricius, 1793)
Phyllobius argentatus (Linnaeus, 1758)
Phyllobius glaucus (Scopoli, 1763)
Phyllobius pomaceus Gyllenhal, 1834
Phyllobius oblongus (Linnaeus, 1758)
Phyllobius roboretanus Gredler, 1882
Phyllobius viridicollis (Fabricius, 1801)
Phyllobius maculicornis Germar, 1824
Phyllobius virideaeris (Laicharting, 1781)
Liophloeus tessulatus (O. F. Müller, 1776)
Pachyrhinus lethierryi (Desbrochers, 1875)
Pachyrhinus mustela (Herbst, 1797)
Polydrusus tereticollis (De Geer, 1775)
Polydrusus formosus (Mayer, 1779)
Polydrusus mollis (Ström, 1768)
Polydrusus confluens Stephens, 1831
Polydrusus flavipes (De Geer, 1775)
Polydrusus pterygomalis Boheman, 1840
Polydrusus marginatus Stephens, 1831
Polydrusus cervinus (Linnaeus, 1758)
Polydrusus pilosus Gredler, 1866
Polydrusus pulchellus Stephens, 1831
Barypeithes sulcifrons (Boheman, 1843)
Barypeithes araneiformis (Schrank, 1781)
Barypeithes curvimanus (Jacquelin du Val, 1855)
Barypeithes pellucidus (Boheman, 1834)
Barypeithes pyrenaeus Seidlitz, 1868
Brachysomus echinatus (Bonsdorff, 1785)
Brachysomus hirtus (Boheman, 1845)
Sciaphilus asperatus (Bonsdorff, 1785)
Andrion regensteinense (Herbst, 1797)
Charagmus griseus (Fabricius, 1775)
Coelositona cambricus (Stephens, 1831)
Coelositona cinerascens (Fåhraeus, 1840)
Coelositona puberulus (Reitter, 1903)
Sitona ambiguus Gyllenhal, 1834
Sitona cylindricollis (Fåhraeus, 1840)
Sitona gemellatus Gyllenhal, 1834
Sitona hispidulus (Fabricius, 1777)
Sitona humeralis Stephens, 1831
Sitona lepidus Gyllenhal, 1834
Sitona lineatus (Linnaeus, 1758)
Sitona lineellus (Bonsdorff, 1785)
Sitona macularius (Marsham, 1802)
Sitona ononidis Sharp, 1866
Sitona puncticollis Stephens, 1831
Sitona striatellus Gyllenhal, 1834
Sitona sulcifrons (Thunberg, 1798)
Sitona suturalis Stephens, 1831
Sitona waterhousei Walton, 1846
Tanymecus palliatus (Fabricius, 1787)
Cathormiocerus attaphilus Brisout, Ch., 1880
Cathormiocerus maritimus Rye, 1874
Cathormiocerus myrmecophilus (Seidlitz, 1868)
Cathormiocerus socius Boheman, 1843
Romualdius scaber (Linnaeus, 1758)
Trachyphloeus alternans Gyllenhal, 1834
Trachyphloeus angustisetulus Hansen, 1915
Trachyphloeus aristatus (Gyllenhal, 1827)
Trachyphloeus asperatus Boheman, 1843
Trachyphloeus digitalis (Gyllenhal, 1827)
Trachyphloeus rectus C. G. Thomson, 1865
Trachyphloeus scabriculus (Linnaeus, 1771)
Trachyphloeus spinimanus Germar, 1824
Tropiphorus elevatus (Herbst, 1795)
Tropiphorus obtusus (Bonsdorff, 1785)
Tropiphorus terricola (Newman, 1838)
Hypera arator (Linnaeus, 1758)
Hypera fuscocinerea (Marsham, 1802)
Hypera nigrirostris (Fabricius, 1775)
Hypera ononidis Chevrolat, 1863
Hypera plantaginis (De Geer, 1775)
Hypera postica (Gyllenhal, 1813)
Hypera suspiciosa (Herbst, 1795)
Hypera venusta (Fabricius, 1781)
Hypera dauci (Olivier, 1807)
Hypera zoilus (Scopoli, 1763)
Hypera diversipunctata (Schrank, 1798)
Hypera meles (Fabricius, 1793)
Hypera arundinis (Paykull, 1792)
Hypera pollux (Fabricius, 1801)
Hypera rumicis (Linnaeus, 1758)
Hypera pastinaceae (Rossi, 1790)
Limobius borealis (Paykull, 1792)
Limobius mixtus (Boheman, 1834)
Larinus planus (Fabricius, 1793)
Lixus paraplecticus (Linnaeus, 1758)
Lixus angustatus (Fabricius, 1775)
Lixus vilis (Rossi, 1790)
Lixus iridis Olivier, 1807
Lixus scabricollis Boheman, 1843
Bothynoderes affinis (Schrank, 1781)
Cleonis pigra (Scopoli, 1763)
Coniocleonus hollbergii (Fåhraeus, 1842)
Coniocleonus nebulosus (Linnaeus, 1758)
Rhinocyllus conicus (Frölich, 1792)
Magdalis duplicata Germar, 1818
Magdalis memnonia (Gyllenhal in Faldermann, 1837)
Magdalis phlegmatica (Herbst, 1797)
Magdalis ruficornis (Linnaeus, 1758)
Magdalis armigera (Fourcroy, 1785)
Magdalis carbonaria (Linnaeus, 1758)
Magdalis barbicornis (Latreille, 1804)
Magdalis cerasi (Linnaeus, 1758)
Liparus coronatus (Goeze, 1777)
Liparus germanus (Linnaeus, 1758)
Leiosoma deflexum (Panzer, 1795)
Leiosoma oblongulum Boheman, 1842
Leiosoma troglodytes (Rye, 1873)
Mitoplinthus caliginosus (Fabricius, 1775)
Anchonidium unguiculare (Aubé, 1850)
Anoplus plantaris (Naezen, 1794)
Anoplus roboris Suffrian, 1840
Hylobius abietis (Linnaeus, 1758)
Hylobius transversovittatus (Goeze, 1777)
Lepyrus capucinus (Schaller, 1783)
Syagrius intrudens C. O. Waterhouse, 1903
Pissodes castaneus (De Geer, 1775)
Pissodes pini (Linnaeus, 1758)
Pissodes validirostris (C. R. Sahlberg, 1834)
Trachodes hispidus (Linnaeus, 1758)
Orobitis cyaneus (Linnaeus, 1758)
Scolytus intricatus (Ratzeburg, 1837)
Scolytus laevis Chapuis, 1873
Scolytus mali (Bechstein & Scharfenberg, 1805)
Scolytus multistriatus (Marsham, 1802)
Scolytus pygmaeus (Fabricius, 1787)
Scolytus ratzeburgi Janson, 1856
Scolytus rugulosus (P. W. J. Müller, 1818)
Scolytus scolytus (Fabricius, 1775)
Pityophthorus lichtensteinii (Ratzeburg, 1837)
Pityophthorus pubescens (Marsham, 1802)
Cryphalus asperatus (Gyllenhal, 1813)
Ernoporicus caucasicus (Lindemann, 1876)
Ernoporicus fagi (Fabricius, 1798)
Ernoporus tiliae (Panzer, 1793)
Trypophloeus binodulus (Ratzeburg, 1837)
Crypturgus subcribrosus Eggers, 1933
Dryocoetes alni (Georg, 1856)
Dryocoetes autographus (Ratzeburg, 1837)
Dryocoetes villosus (Fabricius, 1793)
Lymantor coryli (Perris, 1855)
Taphrorychus bicolor (Herbst, 1793)
Taphrorychus villifrons (Dufour, 1843)
Xylocleptes bispinus (Duftschmid, 1825)
Ips acuminatus (Gyllenhal, 1827)
Ips cembrae (Heer, 1836)
Ips sexdentatus (Boerner, 1767)
Ips typographus (Linnaeus, 1758)
Orthotomicus erosus (Wollaston, 1857)
Orthotomicus laricis (Fabricius, 1793)
Orthotomicus suturalis (Gyllenhal, 1827)
Pityogenes bidentatus (Herbst, 1783)
Pityogenes chalcographus (Linnaeus, 1761)
Pityogenes quadridens (Hartig, 1834)
Pityogenes trepanatus (Nördlinger, 1848)
Xyleborinus saxesenii (Ratzeburg, 1837)
Xyleborus dispar (Fabricius, 1793)
Xyleborus dryographus (Ratzeburg, 1837)
Xyleborus monographus (Fabricius, 1793)
Trypodendron domesticum (Linnaeus, 1758)
Trypodendron lineatum (Olivier, 1795)
Trypodendron signatum (Fabricius, 1793)
Hylesinus crenatus (Fabricius, 1787)
Hylesinus orni Fuchs, 1906
Hylesinus toranio (Danthoine in Bernard, 1788)
Hylesinus varius (Fabricius, 1775)
Hylastinus obscurus (Marsham, 1802)
Kissophagus hederae (Schmitt, 1843)
Pteleobius vittatus (Fabricius, 1787)
Hylastes angustatus (Herbst, 1793)
Hylastes ater (Paykull, 1800)
Hylastes attenuatus Erichson, 1836
Hylastes brunneus Erichson, 1836
Hylastes cunicularius Erichson, 1836
Hylastes opacus Erichson, 1836
Hylurgops palliatus (Gyllenhal, 1813)
Phloeosinus bicolor (Brullé, 1832)
Phloeosinus thujae (Perris, 1855)
Phloeotribus rhododactylus (Marsham, 1802)
Polygraphus poligraphus (Linnaeus, 1758)
Dendroctonus micans (Kugelann, 1794)
Tomicus minor (Hartig, 1834)
Tomicus piniperda (Linnaeus, 1758)
Xylechinus pilosus (Ratzeburg, 1837)
Tanysphyrus lemnae (Paykull, 1792)
Family Platypodidae Shuckard, 1840
Platypus cylindrus (Fabricius, 1793)

References

Weevils